Alexey Nikolayevich Spirin (born 4 January 1952, in Ruzayevka, Mordovian ASSR, Russian SFSR, Soviet Union) is a former football referee from Russia. He refereed one match in the 1990 FIFA World Cup in Italy and the opening game of Euro 1992.

References

External links 
 
 

1952 births
Living people
Russian football referees
FIFA World Cup referees
1990 FIFA World Cup referees
UEFA Euro 1992 referees